Paul Edme de Musset (7 November 1804 – 17 May 1880) was a French writer.

He was born in Paris, the elder brother of Alfred de Musset. Paul de Musset's career centred largely on the life and achievements of his more famous brother. 

In 1859, two years after the death of his brother, Paul de Musset published Lui et Elle, a parody of George Sand's autobiographical work Elle et Lui, published six months previously, dealing with her relationship with Alfred de Musset. In 1861, he married Aimée d'Alton, who had also been involved with Alfred de Musset and to whom she had been engaged in her youth.

He was buried at the Père Lachaise Cemetery in Paris.

Bibliography (partial)
 Voyage pittoresque en Italie, partie septentrionale, 1855
 Voyage pittoresque en Italie, partie méridionale, et en Sicile, 1856
 Lui et Elle, 1859.
 Biographie de Alfred de Musset: sa vie et son œuvre,  Éditions G. Charpentier, 1877
 Monsieur Le Vent et Madame La Pluie, 1879
 En voiturin: voyage en Italie et en Sicile, 1885

External links
 
 
 Imago Mundi biographical dictionary

1804 births
1880 deaths
19th-century French writers
Romanticism
Burials at Père Lachaise Cemetery
French male writers